Ministry of Dance is an Australian dance school based in Penrith, New South Wales. It established in 2006.

History 

Ministry of Dance was founded by Jaclyn Bennett in April 2006. Ministry of Dance started with 20 students in a tiny church hall in Orchard Hills. In June 2006 Ministry of Dance moved into their very own purpose-built studios in Jamisontown. By 2010 Ministry had grown to over 500 students, making it one of the largest studios in Sydney.

During 2009 the school won multiple eisteddfods from around the wider Sydney area. They competed in the McDonald's challenge and received a Highly Commended in the open age lyrical event and placed 3rd in the open age Hip Hop, losing to Brent Street Studios (2nd) and Urban Dance Company (1st). Their greatest Achievement for the year was being crowned National Champions for Hip Hop and winning the Battle of the Stars in the Senior Small Group category. Both of these titles were won at the prestigious Peter Oxford’s 'Showcase' Australian Dance Championships.

Ministry offers a large variety of classes including Ballet, Jazz, Tap, Hip Hop, Breakdancing, Acrobatics, Circus classes, Silks and more. 
Ministry of Dance have the largest Baby and Toddler department running over 20 classes per week for all children as young as 12 months old.

In 2012, due to the increasing success and popularity of her petite programs, Jaclyn launched her Baby and Toddler dance and movement studio Munchie Movers.

Munchie Movers continues to grow with studios in Pyrmont, Penrith and Bondi.

Footnotes

External links 
Ministry of Dance official website
Munchie Movers official website
Showcase National Championships website
Sydney Eisteddford website

Dance schools in Australia